e820 is shorthand for the facility by which the BIOS of x86-based computer systems reports the memory map to the operating system or boot loader.

It is accessed via the int 15h call, by setting the  register to value E820 in hexadecimal.
It reports which memory address ranges are usable and which are reserved for use by the BIOS.

BIOS-e820 is often the first thing reported by a booting Linux kernel, and it can also be seen with the dmesg command.

References

External links
 Detecting Memory (x86): BIOS Function: INT 0x15, EAX = 0xE820

BIOS